Tullio Gonnelli (21 November 1912 – 12 January 2005) was an Italian athlete who competed mainly in the 100 metres. He was born in Pieve di Cento, Bologna, Italy.

Biography
He competed for Italy in the 1936 Summer Olympics held in Berlin, Germany in the 4 x 100 metre relay where he won the silver medal with his team mates Orazio Mariani, Gianni Caldana and Elio Ragni. He participated in 1934 European Athletics Championships – Men's 200 metres and 1938 European Athletics Championships – Men's 4 × 100 metres relay. Gonnelli was looking forward to competing in the 1940 Summer Olympics in Tokyo but the advent of World War II meant the cancellation of the Games and he served 3 years in the army instead. He died in Longmeadow, Massachusetts, United States.

Olympic results

National titles
Tullio Gonnelli has won 5 times the individual national championship.
1 win in the 100 metres (1935)
4 wins in the 200 metres (1935, 1938, 1939, 1940)

See also
 Italy national relay team

References

External links
 

Italian male sprinters
Italian military personnel of World War II
Olympic athletes of Italy
1912 births
2005 deaths
Athletes (track and field) at the 1936 Summer Olympics
Medalists at the 1936 Summer Olympics
Olympic silver medalists for Italy
Olympic silver medalists in athletics (track and field)
People from Cento
Italian Athletics Championships winners
Sportspeople from the Metropolitan City of Bologna